Schooler may refer to:

Student, a school pupil
Teacher, someone who schools pupils

People
Aaron Schooler (born 1985), Canadian cyclo-cross cyclist
Brenden Schooler (born 1997), American football player
Carmi Schooler (1933–2018), American psychologist
Colin Schooler (born 1997), American football player
Jonathan Schooler (born 1959), American professor and son of Carmi
Nina Schooler (born 1934), American psychiatrist, widow of Carmi, and mother of Jonathan
Mike Schooler (born 1962), American baseball player

Other uses
Schooler Creek Group, a stratigraphical unit of Ladinian to Norian age in the Western Canadian Sedimentary Basin.

See also
School (disambiguation)
Scholar (disambiguation)